Malibu is a coconut flavored liqueur, made with Caribbean rum, and possessing an alcohol content by volume of 21.0 % (42 proof). As of 2017 the Malibu brand is owned by Pernod Ricard, who calls it a "flavored rum", where this designation is allowed by local laws.

History 

The product was created by Tom Jago of International Distillers & Vintners, and originally made from fruit spirits, flavored with rum and coconut flavoring in Curaçao. Originally, the product was used to simplify the making of piña coladas by bartenders. When the product took off, the production was then moved to Barbados, where the rum is made by West Indies Rum Distillery Ltd., and the quality of the ingredients used was improved.

The brand was sold by Diageo to Allied Domecq for £560m ($800m) in 2002. In 2005, French company Pernod Ricard purchased Allied Domecq for $14 billion. The deal meant that Pernod Ricard acquired a number of alcoholic beverage brands including Malibu rum.

Marketing 

Past advertising campaigns labeled it "seriously easy going" and usually features people from the Caribbean taking life seriously, in a parody of the stress associated with the Western urban lifestyle, with a voice over at the end saying "If people in the Caribbean took life as seriously as this, they would never have invented Malibu. It's seriously easy going." This Caribbean focus of Malibu's advertising stands in some contrast to the fact that the town after which it is named is in California rather than the Caribbean region.

Since 2014, the advertising campaign has shifted toward the idea of Malibu encouraging people to have their "best summer ever" with a YouTube campaign and TV ads showing the difference between "summer you vs rest of the year you". In 2016 Malibu started an internet campaign with a commerce website and via the hashtag #Malibu.

Variations 

The original version of Malibu rum is flavored with coconut. There are many different versions of Malibu rum in the worldwide market, flavored with various tropical fruits such as banana, pineapple, passion fruit, island melon and mango. Additionally, there is a blend with mint, known as Malibu Fresh, a version mixed with tequila known as Malibu Red, and a double-strength version known as Malibu Black, which is a 35% alcohol by volume (ABV) rum-based liqueur that combines dark rum and the original coconut-flavored liqueur.

See also 

 Piña colada

References

External links 

 

Barbadian brands
Drink companies of Barbados
Foods containing coconut
Pernod Ricard brands
Liqueurs